Atanarjuat: The Fast Runner is a 2001 Canadian epic film directed by Inuit filmmaker Zacharias Kunuk and produced by his company Isuma Igloolik Productions.  It was the first feature film ever to be written, directed and acted entirely in the Inuktitut language.

Set in the ancient past, the film retells an Inuit legend passed down through centuries of oral tradition. It revolves around the title character, whose marriage with his two wives earns him the animosity of the son of the band leader, who kills Atanarjuat's brother and forces Atanarjuat to flee by foot.

The film premiered at the 54th Cannes Film Festival in May 2001, and was released in Canada on 12 April 2002. A major critical success, Atanarjuat won the Caméra d'Or (Golden Camera) at Cannes, and six Genie Awards, including Best Motion Picture. Atanarjuat was also a commercial success, becoming Canada's top-grossing release of 2002, outperforming the mainstream comedy Men with Brooms. It grossed more than US$5 million worldwide. In 2015, a poll of filmmakers and critics in the Toronto International Film Festival named it the greatest Canadian film of all time.

Plot
At Igloolik ("place of houses") in the Eastern Arctic wilderness at the dawn of the first millennium, Qulitalik bids goodbye to his sister Panikpak, wife of Kumaglak, promising to come if she calls for help in her heart. She gives him her husband's rabbit's foot for spiritual power.

In a flashback, the community is visited by the strange shaman Tungajuaq. During a spiritual duel with the visitor, the camp leader Kumaglak dies. The visitor removes the walrus-tooth necklace from Kumaglak's body, and puts the necklace around the neck of Kumaglak's son Sauri, who thus becomes camp leader. Much later, the shaman's magic has poisoned the community with hatred. Tulimaq, the laughing stock of the camp, is having bad luck hunting and can barely feed his family, but Panikpak brings meat for Tulimaq's children, Atanarjuat and Amaqjuaq, hoping that one day they will make things right.

Atanarjuat grows up to be a fast runner, Amaqjuaq is strong, and they are rivals with Sauri and his son Oki. During a game of 'wolf tag' Atanarjuat pursues the beautiful Atuat, provoking jealousy in Oki. Oki's sister Puja also shows interest in Atanarjuat. In a punching duel with Oki, Atanarjuat wins the right to marry Atuat. Later, Atanarjuat leaves his wife Atuat at a camp to hunt caribou, but he stops at Sauri's camp, where he is persuaded to take Puja on the hunt. Camping by a lake, Atanarjuat and Puja sing, flirt, and have sex.

Later, Atanarjuat is in an unhappy marriage with Atuat and Puja. He catches his brother having sex with Puja and strikes Puja. She runs to Sauri's camp and tells them that Atanarjuat tried to kill her, so Sauri and Oki decide to kill Atanarjuat; Panikpak, however, remains skeptical of Puja's accusations. Puja returns to Atanarjuat's camp apologizing, and is accepted back. One day the women decide to go find eggs, but first Puja places a boot outside the tent where the men are resting. Oki and two henchmen sneak up and plunge their spears through the tent wall. Amaqjuaq is killed, but Oki is startled by a vision of his grandfather Kumaglak, and Atanarjuat, naked and barefoot, bursts out of the tent and runs for miles across the ice, pursued by Oki's gang. Atanarjuat escapes by following a vision of Qulitalik and jumping a wide open crack in the ice. Eventually he collapses in exhaustion with bloody feet. He is rescued by Qulitalik and his family, who conceal him when Oki arrives in pursuit.

Back at Igloolik, Sauri refuses to let Oki have Atuat, but Oki rapes Atuat, who is comforted by Panikpak. During a hunt, Oki stabs Sauri and claims it was an accident, and takes over as camp leader. In her heart, Panikpak summons her brother Qulitalik to come, as they agreed years ago. Qulitalik feels her call and makes magic with the rabbit foot: at Igloolik Oki catches a rabbit with his bare hands, eats it, and falls under a spell that makes him forget his grievances. Qulitalik and the family make the long sled journey back to Igloolik with Atanarjuat, who has healed. Atanarjuat is joyfully reunited with Atuat but rejects Puja. The spell-happy Oki just wants to have a feast. But Atanarjuat prepares an ice floor in an igloo and invites Oki and his brothers inside. He slips antlers on his feet to grip the ice and subdues them, declaring that the killing is over. It is now time to confront the evil that has plagued the community for so long. With everyone gathered together, Qulitalik calls forth the spirits, and the evil shaman Tungajuaq appears, grunting like a polar bear. Qulitalik confronts the shaman with the powerful spirit of the walrus and magic soil, Panikpak shakes the walrus tooth necklace, and the shaman is destroyed and vanishes. Panikpak tells the group it is time for forgiveness: Oki, Puja and their friends are forgiven for their evil deeds, but are exiled from Igloolik forever.

Cast

Atanarjuat's family
Natar Ungalaaq as Atanarjuat, "the fast runner"
Pakak Innuksuk as Amaqjuaq, "the strong one", Atanarjuat's older brother
Neeve Irngaut as Uluriaq, wife of Amaqjuaq
Felix Alaralak as Tulimaq, Atanarjuat's father
Stephen Qrunnut as Young Tulimaq
Kumaglaq, the young son of Atanarjuat and Atuat; namesake of the old camp leader.

Oki's family
Peter-Henry Arnatsiaq as Oki, Atanarjuat's rival
Lucy Tulugarjuk as Puja, Oki's spoiled sister
Apayata Kotierk as Kumaglak, the old camp leader
Madeline Ivalu as Panikpak, wife of Kumaglak, mother of Sauri, grandmother of Oki and Puja, and sister of Qulitalik
Mary Angutautuk as Young Panikpak
Pauloosie Qulitalik as Qulitalik, brother of Panikpak
Charlie Qulitalik as Young Qulitalik
Mary Qulitalik as Niriuniq, wife of Qulitalik
Eugene Ipkarnak as Sauri, camp leader
Eric Nutarariaq as Young Sauri

Others
Sylvia Ivalu as Atuat, sought as a wife by Atanarjuat and Oki
Abraham Ulayuruluk as Tungajuaq, the evil shaman
Luke Taqqaugaq as Pittiulak, Oki's sidekick
Alex Uttak as Pakak, Oki's sidekick

Production

Development
The film is set in Igloolik ("place of houses") in the Eastern Arctic wilderness at the dawn of the first millennium, 
The names of Atanarjuat and his brother first appeared in writing in the journals of the explorer Captain George Lyon, who took part in a British expedition to search for the Northwest Passage in 1821–23. The Inuit believe the story of Atanarjuat to be more than five centuries old. This agrees with geomorphological estimates that Qikiqtaarjuk (Herschel Island), Inuktitut for little island and now a peninsula of Igloolik Island, on which much of the action occurs, became a peninsula about 500 years ago due to isostatic rebound. The main elements of the original story are that two brothers are betrayed by their wives and help set up a sneak attack. Rivals plunge their spears through the walls of the brothers' tent, but the fast runner makes an escape across the ice, naked and barefoot. After being rescued and healing, the fast runner sets up his own ambush and succeeds in killing his rivals. It was the first Inuktitut-language screenplay, and the project became the first feature film in Inuktitut.

Writer Paul Apak Angilirq, director Zacharias Kunuk, and many others on the production team had heard the Atanarjuat legend when they were young. Over the course of five years, Angilirq interviewed seven elders for their versions of the story and combined them into one treatment. The final script was developed by the team of Angilirq, Norman Cohn (producer and cinematographer), Kunuk, Herve Paniaq (tribal elder), and Pauloosie Qulitalik. Angilirq died due to cancer during film production in 1998.

Despite the emphasis on accuracy, the film takes liberties with the original Inuit myth: "At the film's core is a crucial lie", wrote Justin Shubow in The American Prospect, which is that the original legend ended in a revenge killing, whereas in the film Atanarjuat stops short of shedding blood. Kunuk felt this was "A message more fitting for our times", and agreed that it "probably" reflected the influence of Christianity and its concept of forgiveness on contemporary Inuit.

After Isuma applied to Telefilm Canada in spring 1998 for financial support, plans were made to begin filming in Igloolik, Nunavut in April. The month was important because April is typically the only time of year in Northern Canada when camera equipment could film winter scenes without malfunctioning due to cold. Kunuk found there was a lack of funding available from Telefilm and the Canadian government, which prioritized English and French-language productions over the languages of Aboriginal Peoples in Canada, and would not provide more than $100,000 for a film in an Aboriginal language, which would make Atanarjuat impossible. Kunuk regarded this as racial discrimination.

Due to difficulty with funding, Isuma instead successfully appealed for support of the National Film Board of Canada. Although the NFB had abandoned fiction, Isuma argued that in documenting Inuit mythology, Atanarjuat was similar to a documentary film. The budget was approved at $1.96 million.

Filming

Achieving historical accuracy was paramount to the production. According to anthropologist Bernard Saladin d'Anglure the biggest challenge was resurrecting the beliefs and practice of shamanism, "the major frame of reference for Inuit life". Research into historical sources—often the journals of European explorers—provided the basis for the reconstruction of clothes and customs. Elders were consulted. In an interview, Paul Apak Angilirq said: 

The filming crew was 90% Inuit. Filming began in 1999, stretching from 3 p.m. to 3 a.m., given the sun was always up. Cohn used natural light in shooting with his Sony DVW 700 digital camera, avoiding switches from the automatic camera settings. The film production pumped more than $1.5 million into the local economy of Igloolik and employed about 60 people. Given the small population, everyone in Igloolik knew at least one crew member.

Kunuk explained how the crew set out:  The crew would costume the actors and apply make-up, only for the production to stall for four hours for ideal weather, which Kunuk said required the patience found in Inuit hunting.

Release

The film premiered at the Cannes Film Festival in May 2001. It was also screened at the Toronto International Film Festival in September 2001.

Its commercial release in Canada came on 12 April 2002, with the only bidder for distribution rights being Alliance Atlantis and its affiliate,  Odeon Films. It had already been playing in France for seven weeks, and was on 83 screens. The film opened in New York City on 7 June 2002.

Reception

Box office
In the Greater Toronto Area, the film competed with the Canadian comedy Men with Brooms, which set box office records among English Canadian cinema. Atanarjuat became more enduring in the box office and became one of the highest-grossing Canadian films to date.

By 7 November 2002, Atanarjuat grossed $1.1 million in Canada, with Odeon Films spokesman Mark Slone declaring this "an unqualified hit". In the U.S., it grossed $1.75 million by 11 July 2002. In France, it drew 200,000 admissions before the commercial Canadian release in April 2002. Its gross was higher than any Canadian film of 2002. The film finished its run on 30 January 2003 having grossed $3,789,952 in North America and $1,398,337 in other territories, for a worldwide total of  $5,188,289.

Critical reception
Atanarjuat: The Fast Runner was praised by critics upon its release. Brian D. Johnson of Maclean's hailed it as a masterpiece and a landmark in international film, writing, "This movie doesn't just transport you to another world; it creates its own sense of time and space." In the Toronto Star, Peter Howell wrote the film overcame the stereotypes of the 1922 film Nanook of the North and "defines an epic in every way".

Roger Ebert from Chicago Sun-Times awarded it four stars, praising the film's acting, fleshed out characters, and direction, calling it "passion, filtered through ritual and memory". Peter Bradshaw from The Guardian praised the film's performances and cinematography, calling the film "A remarkable world first". Tom Dawson from BBC called the film "an impressively vivid and detailed depiction of a particular way of life",  hailing the film's cinematography as "extraordinary". A. O. Scott from The New York Times praised the film, stating "Mr. Kunuk has accomplished the remarkable feat of endowing characters from an old folk tale with complicated psychological motives and responses. The combination of dramatic realism and archaic grandeur is irresistibly powerful". Marjorie Baumgarten from The Austin Chronicle complimented the film's script, cinematography, and visual style as being unique and refreshing. Leonard Maltin awarded the film four stars, calling it "A privileged peek into Inuit culture and a stirring, deeply personal drama".

The goals of the film were first to show how for thousands of years Inuit communities had survived and thrived in the Arctic, and second to introduce the new storytelling medium of film to help Inuit communities survive long into the future. Doug Alexander wrote in the Canadian historical magazine The Beaver that Atanarjuat "is an important step for an indigenous people who have, until recently, seen their culture recorded by outsiders". Jennifer L. Gauthier of CineAction wrote "Atanarjuat was made primarily for Inuit audiences so that they could see positive and accurate images of themselves on the screen". Director Kunuk put it a little more bluntly: "Four thousand years of oral history silenced by fifty years of priests, schools, and cable TV". He explained, "I first heard the story of Atanarjuat from my mother". "Kids all over Nunavut are playing Atanarjuat in the streets," said producer Norman Cohn in a 2002 interview. At one point the production company was considering making Atanarjuat action figures.

In 2004, critics and filmmakers in the Toronto International Film Festival named the film fifth in the Top 10 Canadian Films of All Time. In the next update in 2015, it placed first, prompting Steve Gravestock to comment, "This is likely the first time that a film by an indigenous filmmaker has topped a poll of national cinema." The Nunatsiaq News heralded the choice as a sign Atanarjuat: The Fast Runner "has stood the test of time". However, Eric Moreault, writing for La Presse, dismissed Atanarjuats first-place finish as nonsensical, noting Mon oncle Antoine topped all previous versions. On Rotten Tomatoes, the film has a positive 91% "Certified Fresh" based on 98 reviews, with an average rating of 8/10. The site's consensus reads, "Compelling human drama and stunning cinematography make The Fast Runner an absorbing experience". On Metacritic the film has a score of 91 out of 100 based on 29 critics indicating critical acclaim.

Accolades
The film won the Caméra d'Or at Cannes, the first time a Canadian film won the honour. Canadian historian George Melnyk interpreted this as a sign that "Canadian cinema has come of global age", also pointing to The Barbarian Invasions winning the Academy Award for Best Foreign Language Film. At the 22nd Genie Awards, Krista Uttak accepted the Award for Best Screenplay on behalf of her deceased father Paul Apak Angilirq.

Canada submitted Atanarjuat for consideration for the Academy Award for Best Foreign Language Film. It was one of the rare Canadian films not in French submitted for consideration, with The Necessities of Life in 2008 also containing a substantial amount of Inuktitut.  Atanarjuat was not nominated.

Notes

See also
Indigenous peoples in Northern Canada
 List of submissions to the 74th Academy Awards for Best Foreign Language Film
 List of Canadian submissions for the Academy Award for Best Foreign Language Film

References

Bibliography

External links
 
 
 
 

2000s fantasy drama films
2001 films
Best First Feature Genie and Canadian Screen Award-winning films
Best Picture Genie and Canadian Screen Award winners
Canadian fantasy drama films
Canadian epic films
Films set in Nunavut
Films directed by Zacharias Kunuk
Films set in pre-Columbian America
Films set in prehistory
Films shot in Nunavut
Inuit mythology
Inuktitut-language films
National Film Board of Canada films
Qikiqtaaluk Region
Caméra d'Or winners
2001 directorial debut films
2001 drama films
Films about Inuit in Canada
2000s Canadian films